BHFF is a compound used in scientific research which acts as a positive allosteric modulator at the GABAB receptor. It has anxiolytic effects in animal studies, and good oral bioavailability.

References

External links 

Benzofurans
Trifluoromethyl compounds
Tertiary alcohols
Furanones
GABAB receptor positive allosteric modulators
Tert-butyl compounds